Pataeta carbo is a moth in the family Euteliidae first described by Achille Guenée in 1852.

It is found around the west Pacific, including Australia (in the Australian Capital Territory, the Northern Territory, Queensland and Victoria) as well as in Fiji and Hong Kong.

The wingspan is about 50 mm.

The larvae feed on Eucalyptus and Callistemon species.

References

Moths described in 1852
Euteliinae